The India cricket team toured the West Indies in June and July 2017 to play five One Day Internationals (ODIs) and a Twenty20 International (T20I) match. India won the ODI series 3–1. The West Indies won the one-off T20I match by 9 wickets.

Squads

Sunil Ambris and Kyle Hope replaced Kieran Powell and Jonathan Carter in the West Indies squad for the last three ODIs.

ODI series

1st ODI

2nd ODI

3rd ODI

4th ODI

5th ODI

T20I series

Only T20I

References

External links
 Series home at ESPN Cricinfo

2017 in Indian cricket
2017 in West Indian cricket
International cricket competitions in 2017
Indian cricket tours of the West Indies